Aharon Haliva (born 12 October 1967) is an Israeli Major general (Aluf) who commands the IDF's Military Intelligence Directorate (Israel).

Military service
Haliva was drafted into the IDF in 1985. He volunteered as a paratrooper in the Paratroopers Brigade, and in 1985 became an infantry officer after completing Officer Candidate School. Haliva fought as a platoon leader at the 202 paratroop battalion in Operation Law and Order in Lebanon. Later on he led 202 paratroop battalion in South Lebanon and during the Second Intifada. Afterwards he commanded the Paratroopers Brigade's training base and the 55th Paratroopers Brigade. Later on he led the  Efraim Regional Brigade in counter-terror operations and commanded the IDF's Officer Candidate School (Bahad 1). Then he was assigned as the commander of the 35th Paratroopers Brigade.

He commanded the 98th Paratroopers Division, the Operations Division of the IDF's Operations Directorate and in 2016 he was appointed head of the IDF's Technological and Logistics Directorate.

References

1967 births
Israeli generals
Living people
Israeli military personnel